James Edward Loar III (born November 15, 1977) is an American professional golfer.

Loar was born in Dallas, Texas. He is a left-handed golfer.

Loar played college golf at Oklahoma State University (OSU). He won five college tournaments and his team won the NCAA Division I Championship in 2000. He was a four-time All-American at OSU. He also won four amateur events outside of college: the Southwest Amateur in 1997, the Southern Amateur in 1999, and the Sunnehanna Amateur in 1999 and 2000. Loar played on the 1998 Palmer Cup and 1999 Walker Cup teams.

Loar turned professional in 2000 after graduating from OSU. He played on the Asian Tour from 2002 to 2006 and won twice: the 2003 Thailand Open and the 2004 Kolon Korean Open. He played on the Nationwide Tour in 2007 and 2011, where his best finish was a T-3 at 2007 Utah EnergySolutions Championship. He earned his 2012 PGA Tour card by finishing T-18 at the 2011 PGA Tour Qualifying School. He won the 2012 Panama Claro Championship on the Nationwide Tour.

Loar finished well outside the top 125 on the 2012 money list and tried to regain his Tour privileges through Qualifying School. He was two shots off the lead going into the final round, but double-bogeyed the 17th and bogeyed the 18th for a final round 78, missing a Tour card by two shots with a 32nd-place finish; Loar had full status on the Web.com Tour for 2013 as a result of his finish. He finished fourth on the 2013 Web.com Tour regular season money list to earn his 2014 PGA Tour card. In 2013–14, he made only 3 cuts in 19 events and finished 233rd on the FedEx Cup points list and lost his PGA Tour card.

Loar married Melaney McDaniel on August 12, 2006 and they have a set of triplets born September 5, 2011.

Amateur wins
1997 Southwestern Amateur
1999 Sunnehanna Amateur, Southern Amateur
2000 Sunnehanna Amateur

Professional wins (6)

Asian Tour wins (2)

1Co-sanctioned by the Korean Tour

Asian Tour playoff record (1–0)

Web.com Tour wins (2)

Other wins (2)
2003 Straight Down Fall Classic (with John Pate)
2006 Straight Down Fall Classic (with Don Woodward)

Results in major championships

CUT = missed the half-way cut
"T" = tied

U.S. national team appearances
Amateur
Palmer Cup: 1998 (tie)
Walker Cup: 1999

See also
2011 PGA Tour Qualifying School graduates
2013 Web.com Tour Finals graduates

References

External links

American male golfers
Oklahoma State Cowboys golfers
Asian Tour golfers
PGA Tour golfers
Korn Ferry Tour graduates
Golfers from Dallas
Left-handed golfers
1977 births
Living people